The 2018 Case Western Reserve Spartans football team represented Case Western Reserve University as a member of the Presidents' Athletic Conference (PAC) during the 2018 NCAA Division III football season. The team was coached by 15th-year coach Greg Debeljak and played its home games at DiSanto Field in Cleveland.

Schedule

References

Case Western Reserve
Case Western Reserve Spartans football seasons
Case Western Reserve Spartans football